The Japanese economic miracle refers to Japan's record period of economic growth between the post-World War II era and the end of the Cold War. During the economic boom, Japan rapidly became the world's second-largest economy (after the United States). By the 1990s, Japan's population demographics had begun to stagnate, and the workforce was no longer expanding as quickly as it had in the previous decades despite per-worker productivity remaining high.

Background
This economic miracle was the result of post-World War II Japan and West Germany benefitting from the Cold War.  The American government reformed Japanese society during the occupation of Japan, making political, economic and civic changes.  It occurred chiefly due to the economic interventionism of the Japanese government and partly due to the aid and assistance of the U.S. aid to Asia.  After World War II, the U.S. established a significant presence in Japan to slow the expansion of Soviet influence in the Pacific. The U.S. was also concerned with the growth of the economy of Japan because there was a risk that an unhappy and poor Japanese population would turn to communism and by doing so, ensure Soviet control over the Pacific.

The distinguishing characteristics of the Japanese economy during the "economic miracle" years included: the cooperation of manufacturers, suppliers, distributors, and banks in close-knit groups called keiretsu; the powerful enterprise unions and shuntō; good relations with government bureaucrats, and the guarantee of lifetime employment (shūshin koyō) in big corporations and highly unionized blue-collar factories.

However, some scholars argue that Japan's postwar growth spurt would not have been possible without Japan's alliance with the United States, since the United States absorbed Japanese exports, tolerated controversial Japanese trade practices, subsidized the Japanese economy, and transferred technology to Japanese firms; thereby magnifying the effectiveness of Japanese trade policy.

Governmental contributions
The Japanese financial recovery continued even after SCAP departed and the economic boom propelled by the Korean War abated. The Japanese economy survived from the deep recession caused by a loss of the U.S. payments for military procurement and continued to make gains. By the late 1960s, Japan had risen from the ashes of World War II to achieve an astoundingly rapid and complete economic recovery. According to Knox College Professor Mikiso Hane, the period leading up to the late 1960s saw "the greatest years of prosperity Japan had seen since the Sun Goddess shut herself up behind a stone door to protest her brother Susano-o's misbehaviour." The Japanese government contributed to the post-war Japanese economic miracle by stimulating private sector growth, first by instituting regulations and protectionism that effectively managed economic crises and later by concentrating on trade expansion.

History

Overview

The Japanese economic miracle refers to Japan's record period of economic growth between the end of World War II and the beginning of the 1990s. The economical miracle can be divided into four stages: the recovery (1946–1954), the high increase (1955–1972), the steady increase (1972–1992), and the low increase (1992–2017).

Although heavily damaged by the nuclear bombardment in Hiroshima and Nagasaki, and other Allied air raids on Japan, Japan was able to recover from the trauma of WWII, and managed to become the third-largest economic entity of the world (after the United States and the Soviet Union) by the 1960s. However, after three decades, Japan had experienced the so-called "recession in growth", as the value of the Japanese yen was raised. In an attempt to prevent further slowing of growth, Japan greatly improved its technological advances and raised the value of the yen, since devaluing the yen would have brought further risk and a possible depressing effect on trade. The appreciation of the yen led to a significant economic recession in the 1980s. To alleviate the influence of the recession, Japan imposed a series of economical and financial policies to stimulate domestic demand. Nevertheless, the bubble economy that took place in the late 1980s and early 1990s and the subsequent deflationary policy destroyed the Japanese economy. After the deflationary policy, the Japanese economy has been through a time of low increase period which has lasted until today.

Recovery stage (1946–1954)
The Japanese economy was in ruins following the end of World War II. For example, "the Japanese cotton industry was brought to its knees by the end of the Second World War. Two-thirds of its prewar cotton spindles were scrapped by wartime administrators, and bombing and destruction of urban areas had caused a further loss of 20 percent of spinning and 14 percent of weaving capacity". Moreover, by 1946, Japan was on the verge of a nationwide famine that was averted only by American shipments of food. The virtual destruction of the Japanese standard of living, combined with the military threat presented by the Soviet Union, compelled the United States to support a wide-reaching economic recovery. Every country experienced some industrial growth in the post-war period, but those countries that achieved a heavy drop in industrial output due to war damage such as Japan, West Germany and Italy, achieved the most rapid recovery. In the case of Japan, industrial production decreased in 1946 to 27.6% of the pre-war level, but recovered in 1951 and reached 350% in 1960.

By the end of the American occupation of Japan in 1952, the United States had successfully reintegrated Japan into the global economy and rebuilt the economic infrastructure that would later form the launching pad for the Japanese economic miracle.

One reason for Japan's quick recovery from war trauma was the successful economic reform by the government. The government body principally concerned with industrial policy in Japan was the Ministry of International Trade and Industry. The "Inclined Production Mode" refers to the inclined production that primarily focuses on the production of raw materials including steel, coal and cotton. Textile production occupied more than 23.9% of the total industrial production. Moreover, to further stimulate growth, the Japanese government encouraged women to enter the labor market. The legislation on recruitment contains three components: the restriction placed on regional recruitment and relocation of workers, the banning of the direct recruitment of new school leavers, and the direct recruitment of non-school leavers under explicitly detailed regulations issued by the Ministry of Labour.

The second reason that accounts for Japan's rapid recovery from WWII was the outbreak of the Korean War. The Korean War was fought in territory that had been, until 1945, Chōsen (朝鮮) that Empire of Japan had annexed. As the United States was participating in the conflict on the Korean Peninsula, it turned to the Japanese economy for procurement of equipment and supplies because the logistics of shipping from the States soon became a significant problem for the military. Japan's industry was soon providing the required munitions and logistics to the American forces fighting in Korea. The demand stimulated the Japanese economy enabling it to recover quickly from the destruction of the Pacific War and provide the basis for the rapid expansion that was to follow.

High increasing stage (1954–1972)
After gaining support from the United States and achieving domestic economic reform, Japan's economy was able to soar from the 1950s to the 1970s. Furthermore, Japan also completed its process toward industrialization and became the first developed nation in East Asia. The Japanese Economic Yearbooks from 1967 to 1971 witnessed a significant increase. In 1967, the yearbook said: the Japanese economy in 1966 thus made an advance more rapidly than previously expected. In 1968, the yearbook said that the Japanese economy continued to make a sound growth after it had a bottom in the autumn of 1965. The words "increase", "growth" and "upswing" filled the summaries of the yearbooks from 1967 to 1971. The reasons for Japan to complete industrialization are also complicated, and the major characteristic of this time is the influence of governmental policies of the Hayato Ikeda administration, vast consumption, and vast export.

Influence of governmental policies: Ikeda administration and keiretsu
In 1954, the economic system MITI had cultivated from 1949 to 1953 came into full effect. Prime Minister Hayato Ikeda, whom Chalmers Johnson calls "the single most important individual architect of the Japanese economic miracle," pursued a policy of heavy industrialization. This policy led to the emergence of 'over-loaning' (a practice that continues today) in which the Bank of Japan issues loans to city banks who in turn issue loans to industrial conglomerates. Since there was a shortage of capital in Japan at the time, industrial conglomerates borrowed beyond their capacity to repay, often beyond their net worth, causing city banks in turn to over-borrow from the Bank of Japan. This gave the national Bank of Japan complete control over dependent local banks.

The system of over-loaning, combined with the government's relaxation of anti-monopoly laws (a remnant of SCAP control) also led to the re-emergence of conglomerate groups called keiretsu that mirrored the wartime conglomerates, or zaibatsu. Led by the economic improvements of Sony businessmen Masaru Ibuka and Akio Morita, the keiretsu efficiently allocated resources and became competitive internationally.

At the heart of the keiretsu conglomerates' success lay city banks, which lent generously, formalizing cross-share holdings in diverse industries. The keiretsu spurred both horizontal and vertical integration, locking out foreign companies from Japanese industries. Keiretsu had close relations with MITI and each other through the cross-placement of shares, providing protection from foreign take-overs. For example, 83% of Japan's Development Bank's finances went toward strategic industries: shipbuilding, electric power, coal and steel production. Keiretsu proved crucial to protectionist measures that shielded Japan's sapling economy.

Keiretsu also fostered an attitude shift among Japanese managers that tolerated low profits in the short-run because keiretsu were less concerned with increasing stock dividends and profits and more concerned about interest payments. Approximately only two-thirds of the shares of a given company were traded, cushioning keiretsu against market fluctuations and allowing keiretsu managers to plan for the long-term and maximize market shares instead of focusing on short-term profits.

The Ikeda administration also instituted the Foreign Exchange Allocation Policy, a system of import controls designed to prevent the flooding of Japan's markets by foreign goods. MITI used the foreign exchange allocation to stimulate the economy by promoting exports, managing investment and monitoring production capacity. In 1953, MITIs revised the Foreign Exchange Allocation Policy to promote domestic industries and increase the incentive for exports by revising the export-link system. A later revision-based production capacity on foreign exchange allocation to prevent foreign dumping.

Vast consumption: from survival to recreation
During the time of reconstruction and before the 1973 oil crisis, Japan managed to complete its industrialization process, gaining significant improvement in living standards and witnessing a significant increase in consumption. The average monthly consumption of urban family households doubled from 1955 to 1970. Moreover, the proportions of consumption in Japan was also changing. The consumption in daily necessities, such as food and clothing and footwear, was decreasing. Contrastingly, the consumption in recreational, entertainment activities and goods increased, including furniture, transportation, communications, and reading. The great increase in consumption stimulated the growth in GDP as it incentivized production.

Vast export: Golden Sixties and shift to export trade
The period of rapid economic growth between 1955 and 1961 paved the way for the Golden Sixties, the second decade that is generally associated with the Japanese economic miracle. In 1965, Japan's nominal GDP was estimated at just over $91 billion. Fifteen years later, in 1980, the nominal GDP had soared to a record $1.065 trillion.

Under the leadership of Prime Minister Ikeda, former minister of MITI, the Japanese government undertook an ambitious . The plan called for doubling the size of Japan's economy in ten years through a combination of tax breaks, targeted investment, an expanded social safety net, and incentives to increase exports and industrial development. To achieve the goal of doubling of the economy in ten years, the plan called for an average annual economic growth rate of 7.2%. In fact, Japan's annual growth averaged more than 10% over the course of the Plan, and the economy doubled in size in less than seven years.

Ikeda introduced the Income Doubling Plan in response to the massive Anpo protests in 1960 against the US-Japan Security Treaty, as part of an effort to shift Japan's national dialogue away from contentious political struggles toward building a consensus around pursuit of rapid economic growth. However, Ikeda and his brain trust, which most notably included the economist Osamu Shimomura, had been developing the plan since mid-1959.

Under the Income Doubling Plan, Ikeda lowered interest rates and rapidly expanded government investment in Japan's infrastructure, building highways, high-speed railways, subways, airports, port facilities, and dams. Ikeda's government also expanded government investment in the previously neglected communications sector of the Japanese economy. Each of these acts continued the Japanese trend towards a managed economy that epitomized the mixed economic model.

The Income Doubling Plan was widely viewed as a success in achieving both its political and economic objectives. According to historian Nick Kapur, the plan "enshrined 'economic growthism' as a sort of secular religion of both the Japanese people and their government, bringing about a circumstance in which both the effectiveness of the government and the worth of the populace came to be measured above all by the annual percentage change in GDP."

Besides Ikeda's adherence to government intervention and regulation of the economy, his government pushed trade liberalization. By April 1960, trade imports had been 41 percent liberalized (compared to 22 percent in 1956). Ikeda planned to liberalize trade to 80 percent within three years. However, his liberalization goals met with severe opposition from both industries who had thrived on over-loaning and the nationalist public who feared foreign enterprise takeovers. The Japanese press likened liberalization to "the second coming of the black ships," in reference to the black ships Commodore Matthew C. Perry had sailed into Tokyo Bay in 1853 to open Japan to international trade via a show of military force. Accordingly, Ikeda moved toward liberalization of trade only after securing a protected market through internal regulations that favored Japanese products and firms, and never achieved his ambitious 80 percent goal.

Ikeda also set up numerous allied foreign aid distribution agencies to demonstrate Japan's willingness to participate in the international order and to promote exports. The creation of these agencies not only acted as a small concession to international organizations, but also dissipated some public fears about liberalization of trade. Ikeda furthered Japan's global economic integration by negotiating for Japan's entry into the OECD in 1964. By the time Ikeda left office, the GNP was growing at a phenomenal rate of 13.9 percent.

Steady increasing stage (1973–1992) 
In 1973, the first oil-price shock struck Japan (1973 oil crisis). The price of oil increased from 3 dollars per barrel to over 13 dollars per barrel. During this time, Japan's industrial production decreased by 20%, as the supply capacity could not respond effectively to the rapid expansion of demand, and increased investments in equipment often invited unwanted results—tighter supply and higher prices of commodities. Moreover, the Second Oil Shock in 1978 and 1979 exacerbated the situation as the oil price again increased from 13 dollars per barrel to 39.5 dollars per barrel. Despite being seriously impacted by the two oil crises, Japan was able to withstand the impact and managed to transfer from a product-concentrating to a technology-concentrating production form.

The transformation was, in fact, a product of the oil crises and United States intervention. Since the oil price rose tenfold, the cost of production also soared. After the oil crises, to save costs, Japan had to produce products in a more environmentally friendly manner, and with less oil consumption. The biggest factor that invited industrial changes after the oil crises was the increase in energy prices including crude oil. As a result, Japan converted to a technology-concentrating program, ensuring the steady increase of its economy, and standing out beyond other capitalist countries that had been significantly wounded during the oil crises. Another factor was the friction between the United States and Japan, as Japan's rapid economic growth could potentially harm the economic interests of the United States. In 1985, the United States signed the "Plaza Accord" with Japan, West Germany, France and Britain. The "Plaza Accord" was an attempt to devalue the US dollar, yet harmed Japan the most. Japan attempted to expand international markets through the appreciation of the Japanese yen, yet they over-appreciated, creating a bubble economy. The Plaza Accord was successful in reducing the U.S. trade deficit with Western European nations but largely failed to fulfill its primary objective of alleviating the trade deficit with Japan.

Role of the Ministry of International Trade and Industry
The Ministry of International Trade and Industry (MITI) was instrumental in Japan's post-war economic recovery. According to some scholars, no other governmental regulation or organization had more economic impact than MITI. "The particular speed, form, and consequences of Japanese economic growth," Chalmers Johnson writes, "are not intelligible without reference to the contributions of MITI" (Johnson, vii). Established in 1949, MITI's role began with the "Policy Concerning Industrial Rationalization" (1950) that coordinated efforts by industries to counteract the effects of SCAP's deflationary regulations. In this way, MITI formalized cooperation between the Japanese government and private industry. The extent of the policy was such that if MITI wished to "double steel production, the neo-zaibatsu already has the capital, the construction assets, the makers of production machinery, and most of the other necessary factors already available in-house". The Ministry coordinated various industries, including the emerging keiretsu, toward a specific end, usually toward the intersection of national production goals and private economic interests.

MITI also boosted the industrial security by untying the imports of technology from the imports of other goods. MITI's Foreign Capital Law granted the ministry power to negotiate the price and conditions of technology imports. This element of technological control allowed it to promote industries it deemed promising. The low cost of imported technology allowed for rapid industrial growth. Productivity was greatly improved through new equipment, management, and standardization.

MITI gained the ability to regulate all imports with the abolition of the Economic Stabilization Board and the Foreign Exchange Control Board in August 1952. Although the Economic Stabilization Board was already dominated by MITI, the Yoshida Governments transformed it into the Economic Deliberation Agency, a mere "think tank," in effect giving MITI full control over all Japanese imports. Power over the foreign exchange budget was also handed directly to MITI.

MITI's establishment of the Japan Development Bank also provided the private sector with low-cost capital for long-term growth. The Japan Development Bank introduced access to the Fiscal Investment and Loan Plan, a massive pooling of individual and national savings. At the time FILP controlled four times the savings of the world's largest commercial bank. With this financial power, FILP was able to maintain an abnormally high number of Japanese construction firms (more than twice the number of construction firms of any other nation with a similar GDP).

Controversy
American companies sued Japanese companies for intellectual property theft and patent infringements. Many cases resulted in Japanese companies paying large settlements and court-ordered payments to American companies and individuals.

In 1978, Japan's Ministry of International Trade and Industry provided subsidies, which was illegal under international law, to help Japanese semiconductor companies sell their chips at artificially low prices in the United States while keeping prices high in Japan, a trade practice known as dumping.

In 1982, Hitachi Ltd. pleaded guilty in the United States District Court to charges that it conspired to steal trade secrets from the IBM and transport those documents to Japan. In 1983, Hitachi and IBM announced that a settlement had been reached between the two parties. The terms of the agreement states that "Hitachi has not used the stolen secrets, that any secrets it has will be returned to IBM, and that the names address and business affiliations of all individuals who offered to sell secrets to Hitachi be disclosed."

In 1987, an American federal judge ruled that Sumitomo Corporation infringed on two optical fiber patents held by Corning Inc., and ordered the Japanese company to stop manufacturing and selling a certain type of optical fiber.

In 1992, an American federal court ruled that Minolta pirated Honeywell patents to make autofocus cameras. The jury awarded Honeywell with $96 million.

Despite Japan being an American ally, Toshiba Machine Company illegally sold propeller-milling equipment to the Soviet Union, which was used to make it easier for Soviet submarines to avoid American surveillance. The sale prompted a threat to ban Toshiba imports into the US, and a rebuke from both former Prime Minister Yasuhiro Nakasone and Japan's Minister of Internal Trade and Industry on Toshiba's business behavior.

Although the United States’ so-called trade problem was attributed to the country's own economic policies, the Reagan administration resorted to "Japan bashing" by raising complaints about unfair and illegal Japanese trade practices, which the administration believed contributed to the bilateral trade deficit with Japan. In 1980s, the United States portrayed Japan as an economic threat, and accused Japan of intellectual property theft, currency manipulation, state-sponsored industrial policy, and weakening of US manufacturing.
At the conclusion of the Plaza Accord, former US President Ronald Reagan said, "When governments permit counterfeiting or copying of American products, it is stealing our future, and it is no longer free trade."

Conclusion
The conclusion of the economic miracle coincided with the conclusion of the Cold War. While the Japanese stock market hit its all-time peak at the end of 1989, making a recovery later in 1990, it dropped precipitously in 1991. The year of the conclusion of the Japanese asset price bubble coincided with the Gulf War and the dissolution of the Soviet Union. The subsequent period of economic stagnation has been referred to as the lost decades.

See also
 Economic history of Japan
 Developmental state
 Dodge Line
 Post-war economic boom
 Income Doubling Plan
 Hayato Ikeda
 Four Asian Tigers
 Taiwan Miracle
 Miracle on the Han River
 Chinese economic reform
 Tiger Cub Economies
 Wirtschaftswunder

References

Further reading

 Allen, G.C. Japan's Economic Recovery. Oxford: Oxford University Press, 1958.
 Allinson, Gary. Japan's Postwar History. Ithaca: Cornell University Press, 1997.
 Dower, John. Embracing Defeat: Japan in the Wake of World War II. New York: W.W. Norton, 1999.
 Forsberg, Aaron. America and the Japanese Miracle. Chapel Hill: University of North Carolina Press, 2000.
 Hane, Mikiso. Eastern Phoenix: Japan Since 1945. Boulder: Westview Press, 1996.
 Huber, Thomas. Strategic Economy in Japan. Boulder: Westview Press, 1994.
 Jansen, Marius. The Making of Modern Japan. Belknap, 2000
 Johnson, Chalmers. MITI and the Japanese Miracle: The Growth of Industrial Policy, 1925–1975. Stanford: Stanford University Press, 1982.

 Okazaki, Tetsuji and Takafumi Korenaga. "The Foreign Exchange Allocation Policy in Postwar Japan" in Changes in Exchange Rates in Rapidly Developing Countries. Ed. Takatoshi Ito and Anne Krueger. Chicago: University of Chicago Press, 1999.
 ———. "Foreign Exchange Allocation and Productivity Growth in Postwar Japan: A Case of the Wool Industry" in Japan and the World Economy 11 (1999): 267–285
 Pyle, Kenneth. The Making of Modern Japan, 2nd ed. Lexington: D.C. Heath and Company, 1996.
 Tsuru Shigeto, Japan's Capitalism: Creative Defeat and Beyond, Cambridge: Cambridge University Press, 1993.
 Vestal, James. Planning for Change: Industrial Policy and Japanese Economic Development, 1945–1990. Oxford: Clarendon Press. 1993.
 Van Wolferen, Karel. The Enigma of Japanese Power. Vintage, 1990

External links
 Zaibatsu Dissolution, Reparations and Administrative Guidance
 Japan Must Shake Off U.S.–Style Globalization by Yukio Hatoyama

1940s economic history
1950s economic history
1960s economic history
1970s economic history
1980s economic history
1990s economic history
1940s in Japan
1950s in Japan
1960s in Japan
1970s in Japan
1980s in Japan
1990s in Japan
Economic booms
Economic history of Japan
Cold War history of Japan
Post–World War II economic booms